Cherpulassery (also known by its former name Cherpulacherry) is a town and municipality in the Palakkad district, of Kerala, India. Cherpulassery is often called the Sabarimala of Malabar as the famous Ayyappankavu temple is located here . The Puthanalakkal Bhagavathi temple and the Kalavela and Pooram associated with it is one of the largest festivals in the region. Cherpulassery is known among the football enthusiasts all across the state thanks to the football team AL Madeena, Cherpulassery.

History
Cherpulassery was the seat of Nedungethirppad, the chief of Nedunganad, one of the principalities mentioned in the Chera inscriptions. The Nedunganad Swaroopam dynasty, held sway over the present-day Pattambi and Ottapalam Taluks till it was first conquered by Valluvanad in the early parts of 15th century, and immediately afterwards by the Zamorin of Calicut. The Zamorin appointed his local chieftain at Tharakkal Variyam to rule the area. The Nedunganad Taluk was merged into Walluvanad Taluk in 1860 as a revenue division of Malabar District during British regime, with the Taluk headquarters at Perinthalmanna.

Demographics
 India census, Cherpulassery had a population of 41,267 with 19,808 males and 21,459 females.

Transport
Cherpulassery is well connected by bus with the nearby towns of Ottapalam, Pattambi, Shornur and Perinthalmanna, all of which are at a distance of 17 kms from here. There are also regular bus services to Mannarkkad and Palakkad.

The nearest major railway station is the Shoranur junction railway station. Other stations include Ottapalam and Pattambi ; all of which are at equal distances from Cherpulassery.

Politics
Cherpulassery comes under the Shornur assembly constituency and the Palakkad Loksabha constituency.

Colleges
Cherpulassery College of Science & Technology for Women
Ideal Campus of Education
Malabar Polytechnic College
Kerala Medical College
MES College, Cherpulassery

Notable people
 Appunni Tharakan : Kathakali Aniyara (behind the curtain) artist
Kalamandalam Kuttan Asan

See also
State Highway 53
Palakkad district

References

External links

Villages in Palakkad district